Leon Phillips may refer to:

 Leon C. Phillips (1890–1958), American attorney, state legislator and governor of Oklahoma
 Leon Phillips (chemist) (born 1935), New Zealand physical chemist

See also
 Lion Philips (1794–1866), Dutch tobacco merchant